Stephanie Pearson (born 16 December 1988) is an American actress and filmmaker. She has appeared in the films Kiss Kiss Bang Bang (2005), Insidious: Chapter 2 (2013), Downrange (2017) and Psychosynthesis (2020). She has been featured in the television series Ray Donovan (2015), Rizzoli & Isles (2014-2015), and Pam & Tommy (2022).

Alongside acting, Pearson is a director and has directed music videos for artists Wolfmother, and 98º.

Early life 
Stephanie Pearson was born in Burbank, California on 16 December 1988, the daughter of Lisa Pearson and director and producer Lee Pearson. She has a younger sister, Leila. She grew up in Laguna Beach, California and spent time at her father's production studio watching the shoots. She decided she wanted to become an actor at the age of ten.

Stephanie studied theater at Loyola Marymount University in Los Angeles.

Film career 
Pearson began her career as a child actress starring in a dozens of commercials and international ad campaigns during her childhood and teen years. Stephanie caught the eye of director Shane Black and was cast in the 2005 film Kiss Kiss Bang Bang. Soon after, Pearson landed roles in tv shows The Young And The Restless (2009), 'Til Death (2010), Medium (2010),  Rizzoli & Isles (2014–2015), Ray Donovan (2015), and Murder In The First (2016).

In 2013 Pearson starred in James Wan's Insidious: Chapter 2, opposite Rose Byrne and Ty Simpkins. This film kicked off Pearson's career as a "scream queen" in the indie film scene. Most notably, in 2017 Pearson starred in Ryuhei Kitamura's Downrange, which premiered at the Toronto International Film Festival as part of their Midnight Madness series and won the Jury Prize for Best Film at Spain's Molins Horror Film Festival. Pearson's "stand out" acting in the film was heralded as "an intense and smart" performance. Subsequent lead roles in horror-thriller films for Pearson included 2019's stunt-heavy Recovery, the 2020 release Psychosynthesis directed by Noam Kroll, distributed by Amazon, and 2022's The Sleep.

In 2022 Pearson appeared opposite Sebastian Stan and Lily James in episode two of Hulu's Pam & Tommy.

Directing 
In 2019, Pearson directed the music video for Wolfmother's "Chase The Feeling" featuring Chris Cester from JET, and produced promotional key art for the single. In the spring of 2021, the song and it's body of work was nominated for an APRA Music Award for Most Performed Rock Work

Pearson created a "90's nostalgia throwback" music video and EP cover art for boy band 98º and their pop single "Where Do You Wanna Go" in 2021. Billboard was quoted as saying "the summer just heated up with the new video from 98 Degrees for their hot-weather bop...directed by Stephanie Pearson".

Personal life 
Since 2017, Pearson has been in a relationship with Australian musician Chris Cester, with whom she lives with in Los Angeles.

Filmography

Film

Television

Directing

References 

1988 births
Living people